Lukáš Hušek (born 25 October 2000 in the Czech Republic) is a Czech footballer who plays as a defender for Sparta Prague B.

Career

In 2020, Hušek signed for Sparta Prague, the Czech Republic's most successful club, from Leicester City in the English Premier League.

References

External links
 

Czech footballers
Living people
Association football defenders
2000 births
Czech Republic youth international footballers
Sportspeople from Jablonec nad Nisou
AC Sparta Prague players
FK Pardubice players
FK Viktoria Žižkov players
Czech First League players
Czech National Football League players